Sorsogon may refer to
 Sorsogon Province, province of the Philippines
 Sorsogon City, its capital
 Sorsogon Bay
 Sorsogon (Balikmaya)
 Sorsogon language (disambiguation)